Jermikko (born July 22, 1946) is an American fashion designer and businessperson based in Chicago. She was the first African-American woman to own a store in Chicago's upscale Magnificent Mile.

Early life and career
Jermikko was born as Jermikko Shoshanna Johnson in Chicago in 1946. She began making clothes as a teenager, altering and redesigning family members' outfits. In 1972, after graduating with a BFA from the School of the Art Institute of Chicago, she apprenticed under designer Stanley Korshak in Chicago. In 1979, she opened her own fashion business. She has designed pieces for Spike Lee's 2015 film Chi-Raq and Empire. In 2016, her hoodie design appeared in Beyonce's "Pray You Catch Me" video. Jermikko is the Executive Director of Design and CEO of the Jermikko and JJ Hobeau labels.

Awards and honors
1997 Designer of the Year Award from the Apparel Industry Board
1999 Manufacturer of the Millennium Award

References

External links
Jermikko interview on The History Makers oral history project
 WBEZ interview with Jermikko

University of Chicago alumni
School of the Art Institute of Chicago alumni
African-American fashion designers
American fashion designers
American fashion businesspeople
1946 births
Living people
Businesspeople from Chicago
21st-century African-American people
20th-century African-American people